Kurusaray can refer to:

 Kurusaray, İskilip
 Kurusaray, Kastamonu